Passiondale is the eighth full-length album by God Dethroned, released on April 24, 2009. It is a concept album based on the Battle of Passchendaele in World War I. The album was recorded with only three band members, with Henri Sattler recording all guitar parts. This album returns to the blackened death metal sound originally heard on The Grand Grimoire, Bloody Blasphemy, and Ravenous while retaining the melodic death metal sound of the previous three albums.

Track listing
 "The Cross of Sacrifice" – 1:05  
 "Under a Darkening Sky" – 3:59 
 "No Man's Land" – 3:14
 "Poison Fog" – 6:39 
 "Drowning in Mud" – 3:44 
 "Passiondale" – 4:05
 "No Survivors" – 3:51
 "Behind Enemy Lines" – 3:38
 "Fallen Empires" – 4:49
 "Artifacts of the Great War" – 2:57

Personnel

God Dethroned
Henri Sattler – vocals, guitars
Henk Zinger – bass
Roel Sanders – drums

Guest musicians
Danny Servaes - Keyboards
Midori Hass-Kayanuma - Voice (Track 1)
Marco v.d. Velde (of The Wounded) - Clean Vocals (Tracks 4 and 7)
Joerg Uken - Keyboards (Track 1)

References

2009 albums
Metal Blade Records albums
God Dethroned albums